Kumbakonam Rajamanickam Pillai, 5 August 1898 - 1970 was a Carnatic music violinist of Tamil Nadu, Southern India.

Early Days
He was born in the small village of Alangudi near Needamangalam located on the route going from Thanjavur to Tiruvarur. His mother Kamalathammal was keen that he should develop his musical talents.

He commenced his training first as a vocalist under Nadaswaram maestro Kandaswamy Pillai. Later on, he underwent further training from Tiruvisanallur Pallavi Narayanaswamy Iyer and then from Pandanallur Chinnaswamy Pillai. As an instrumentalist he trained in violin for four years under Tirukodikaval Ramaswamy Iyer who was a disciple of violin maestro Tirukodikaval Krishna Iyer. His teachers opined that his music talents were more suited to be a violinist than to be a singer. So, he devoted full concentration as a violinist.

As a violinist
He concentrated on classical Carnatic music. Most of the time he performed as an accompanist to Carnatic singers rather than giving solo concerts. He accompanied top singers of his time.

Honours and awards

Honours
He was honoured in the Royal Courts of Ramanathapuram, Kochchin, Ettayapuram, Trivandrum and Mysore.
He was appointed Asthana Vidhwan in the Courts at Trivancore in 1940 and at Ettayapuram in 1942.
Trivandrum Chiththirai Thirunal Maharaja honoured Rajamanickam Pillai and presented an elephant to him.

Awards
 Sangeetha Kalanidhi, 1948 Awarded by Music Academy, Chennai.
 Sangeet Natak Akademi, 1959
 Isai Perarignar, 1957 Awarded by Tamil Isai Sangam

Students
M. M. Dandapani Desikar and Mayavaram V. R. Govindaraja Pillai are two of his disciples who became famous. Cine actor Thyagu is his grandson.

Notes

References

Carnatic violinists
Tamil musicians
1898 births
1970 deaths
20th-century violinists
20th-century Indian musicians
Recipients of the Sangeet Natak Akademi Award